Yovie & Nuno is an Indonesian band founded in Bandung, West Java, consisting of Yovie Widianto, Muchamad Ahadiyat, Gail Satiawaki, Ersta, and Rere at the beginning of the formation and brought the name of Yovie & The Nuno in March 2004 (formerly Yovie & The Nuno). At the end of 2005, with the resignation of Gail, Ersta, and Rere, the band changed their name back to Yovie & Nuno; as well as the addition of vocalist Dikta and guitarist Diat. Also in 2012, one of the vocalist member in Yovie & Nuno Dudy resigned from that band.

Members
 Yovie Widianto (1999-2019)
 Yuke Sampurna (2001–2002)
 Rere Reza (2001–2007)
  (1999-2012)
 Gail Satiawaki (2003-2005)
 Arya Windura (2014-2021)
 Pradikta Wicaksono (2007-2022)
 Muchamad Adidayat (1999–present)
 Ersta Satrya Nugraha (2002-2007 dan 2022-present)
 Ady Julian (2019–present)
 Adhyra Yudhi Fajar Maulana (2022–present)
 Chico Andreas Sibuea (2022–present)

Discography
Semua Bintang (2001) - by name Yovie & Nuno
Kemenangan Cinta (2004) - by Yovie & The Nuno
The Special One (2007) - by Yovie & Nuno
Winning Eleven (2010)
Single Galau (2012)
Still The One (2014)
Demi Hati (2019)
Sajadah Panjang (2021)
Misal (2022)

Awards
The band's 2007 album, The Special One, won Best of the Best Album at the 2009 Anugerah Musik Indonesia (AMI) Awards. Their 2010 album, Winning 11, won Best Pop Album at the 2011 AMI Awards.

Film and TV series
 Yovie & His Friends

See also
Kahitna
Pradikta Wicaksono

References

External links
 Berita Yovie & Nuno
 Official website

Indonesian pop music groups
Anugerah Musik Indonesia winners